Mohammad Qasemi (also Romanized as Moḩammad Qāsemī; also known as Mohammad Ghasem) is a village in Bala Deh Rural District, Beyram District, Larestan County, Fars Province, Iran. At the 2006 census, its population was 543, in 93 families.

References 

Populated places in Larestan County